"My Baby Daddy" is a single by B-Rock and the Bizz from their debut album  Porkin' Beans & Wienes. The song used a sample of "Best of My Love" by The Emotions.

Released in early 1997, the song became a top 10 hit for the group, reaching 10 on the Billboard Hot 100. A month after its release the single had sold 500,000 copies and earned a gold certification on May 28, 1997 from the Recording Industry Association of America. Despite the success of the single, problems with their label LaFace Records resulted in the group leaving the label without releasing a follow-up single or their debut album. The album was eventually released two years later (in late 1999) on the independent label Tony Mercedes, however, the group never released another single or album.

Single track listing
"My Baby Daddy" (Radio Edit)- 3:34  
"My Baby Daddy" (Bassed Out Club Mix)- 4:42  
"My Baby Daddy" (Instrumental)- 3:34  
"My Baby Daddy" (Acappella)- 3:35

Charts and certifications

Weekly charts

Year-end charts

Certifications

|}

References

1997 debut singles
1997 songs
LaFace Records singles
Comedy rap songs
Songs written by Maurice White
Songs written by Al McKay